Dorcadion becerrae is a species of beetle in the family Cerambycidae. It was described by Lauffer in 1901. It is known from Spain.

See also 
Dorcadion

References

becerrae
Beetles described in 1901